Princess Kanokvanna Lekha (21 December 1857 - 29 June 1918) was a Princess of Siam (later Thailand). She was a member of the Siamese royal family, a daughter of King Mongkut and Chao Chom Manda Tieng Rojanadis.   

Her mother was Tieng Rojanadis (is a daughter of Dis Rojanadis and Klai Rojanadis). Her full name given by her father was Phra Chao Borom wong Ther Phra Ong Chao Kanokvanna Lekha.

Princess Kanokvanna Lekha died 29 June 1916 at the age 60.

References 

1857 births
1918 deaths
19th-century Thai women
19th-century Chakri dynasty
20th-century Thai women
20th-century Chakri dynasty
Thai female Phra Ong Chao
Children of Mongkut
People from Bangkok
Daughters of kings